Is This Real? is the debut studio album by the Portland, Oregon-based punk rock band Wipers, originally released on vinyl in January 1980 by Park Avenue Records.

The album was reissued on CD by Sub Pop in 1993, augmented by the three tracks from the Alien Boy EP.

In 2001, it was digitally remastered by Sage and reissued again on his own Zeno Records as part of a 3-CD set, with the track list altered so that the song "Alien Boy" appeared together with the other three tracks from the Alien Boy EP, after "Wait a Minute".

It was reissued on LP by Jackpot Records in 2006, remastered again from the original tapes that Sage provided to the label.

Release

Initially wanting to put it out through his own Trap Records, Sage decided to release the album through Park Avenue Records, hoping that it would give them slightly wider distribution. Before it was released, Park Avenue insisted that the band re-record the album at a professional studio, as it was originally recorded at the band's rehearsal studio on a 4-track recorder.

Initial reception 
When finally released, the album was not promoted and received little attention, only developing a cult following in the band's hometown. Reviewing for The Village Voice in 1980, Robert Christgau wrote,

Reappraisal & legacy 
The album (and the band's music in general) gained a slightly wider audience during the early 1990s when grunge band Nirvana covered the songs "Return of the Rat" and "D-7" on a Wipers tribute album and the group's Hormoaning EP. A different mix of the tribute album recording appeared on the 2004 Nirvana box set With the Lights Out. In 1993, Nirvana vocalist/guitarist Kurt Cobain listed Is This Real?, along with two other Wipers albums, in his list of 50 albums he thought were most influential to Nirvana's sound in his Journals. BBC Radio 1 DJ John Peel stated in a 1993 interview that it was one of his top 20 favorite albums.

Is This Real? later came to be regarded as a classic punk rock album of the 1980s. Stephen Howell of AllMusic, in his retrospective review, rated the album 4 out of 5 stars and stated that the production "leaves much to be desired with its tinny-sounding drums, but fortunately, the negatives don't outweigh the positives." He also said that Sage wrote "fairly simplistic songs with power chords, but each melody infects your brain like a fever" and noted that much of the album has a dark and ominous feel. In 2001, Spin ranked it the 40th most "essential" punk album of all time.

Cover versions
Apart from the aforementioned Nirvana cover, "Return of the Rat" was also covered by Bored! on their album Scuzz. The track "Mystery" was covered by numerous bands including Eagulls, JEFF the Brotherhood, Shellshag, Rose Melberg, and Meat Wave. "Up Front" was covered by Poison Idea and Corin Tucker, "Potential Suicide" by Napalm Beach, and "Wait A Minute" by My Vitriol.

Track listing

Personnel
 Greg Sage – lead vocals, guitar
 Dave Koupal – bass
 Sam Henry – drums

Production
 Greg Sage – producer
 Bob Stoutenberg – engineer, recording
 Mark Heim; Mike King – cover art
 Jay Elliot – sleeve art

References

1980 debut albums
Wipers albums
Sub Pop albums